Maine Ridge is a ridge that extends northwest–southeast between Matataua Glacier and Tedrow Glacier in the Royal Society Range, Antarctica. It was named after the University of Maine, Orono, in association with other features in the immediate area named for educational institutions, such as Emmanuel Glacier, Johns Hopkins Ridge, and Rutgers Glacier.

References

University of Maine
Ridges of Victoria Land
Scott Coast